This is the order of battle for Operation Michael, part of the German Spring Offensive fought from 21 March to 5 April 1918 as one of the main engagements of the First World War.  It was fought between mixed French, British and Dominion forces and the
German Empire in the Somme region in northern France.

German forces, Western Front

Army Group Crown Prince Rupprecht 
 Generalfeldmarschall Rupprecht, Crown Prince of Bavaria
 Chief of Staff: General Hermann von Kuhl
 4th Army (18 divisions)
 General der Infanterie Sixt von Armin
 Chief of Staff: General Fritz von Loßberg
 6th Army (15 divisions)
 General der Infanterie Ferdinand von Quast
 Chief of Staff: Lieutenant-Colonel Hermann Baron von Lenz
 17th Army (28 divisions) *
 General der Infanterie Otto von Below
 Chief of Staff: General Konrad Krafft von Dellmensingen
 2nd Army (21 divisions)
 General der Kavallerie Georg von der Marwitz
 Chief of Staff: Colonel Erich von Tschischwitz

Army Group German Crown Prince 
 General der Infanterie Wilhelm, Crown Prince of Germany
 Chief of Staff: Colonel Friedrich Bernhard Count von der Schulenburg
 18th Army (27 divisions)
 General der Infanterie Oskar von Hutier
 Chief of Staff: General Traugott von Sauberzweig
 7th Army (11 divisions)
 Generaloberst Max von Boehn
 Chief of Staff: Lieutenant-Colonel Walther Reinhardt
 1st Army (12 divisions)
 General der Infanterie Fritz von Below
 Chief of Staff: Lieutenant-Colonel Robert von Klüber
 3rd Army (11 divisions)
 Generaloberst Karl von Einem
 Chief of Staff: Lieutenant-Colonel Wilhelm von Klewitz

Army Group Gallwitz 
 General der Artillerie Max von Gallwitz
 Chief of Staff: Lieutenant-Colonel Richard von Pawelsz
 5th Army (12 divisions)
 General der Artillerie Max von Gallwitz
 Chief of Staff: Lieutenant-Colonel von Pawelsz
 Armee-Abteilung C (12 divisions)
 Generalleutnant 
 Chief of Staff: Colonel Otto Baron von Ledebur

Army Group Duke Albrecht 
 Generalfeldmarschall Albrecht, Duke of Württemberg
 Chief of Staff: Colonel Wilhelm Heye
 19th Army (10.5 divisions)
 General der Infanterie Felix Graf von Bothmer
 Chief of Staff: Colonel Hans Ritter von Hemmer
 Armee-Abteilung A (5 infantry, 2 dismounted cavalry divisions)
 General der Infanterie Bruno von Mudra
 Chief of Staff: Lieutenant-Colonel Friedrich Baron von Esebeck
 Armee-Abteilung B (9 infantry, 1 dismounted cavalry division)
 General der Infanterie Erich von Gündell
 Chief of Staff: Lieutenant-Colonel Hermann Drechsel

British armies

Fifth Army
General Sir Hubert Gough
 III Corps (Lieutenant-General Sir R. H. K. Butler)
 58th (2/1st London) Division
 18th (Eastern) Division
 14th (Light) Division
 XVIII Corps (Lieutenant-General Sir I. Maxse)
 36th (Ulster) Division
 30th Division
 61st (2nd South Midland) Division
 20th (Light) Division (from 21 March)
 XIX Corps (Lieutenant-General Sir H. E. Watts)
 24th Division
 66th (2nd East Lancashire) Division
 50th (Northumbrian) Division (from 21 March)
 8th Division (from 22 March)
 VII Corps (Lieutenant-General Sir W. N. Congreve )
 16th (Irish) Division
 21st Division
 9th (Scottish) Division
 39th Division
 35th Division (from 23 March)
 12th (Eastern) Division (from 25 March)
US Army
 6th Battalion United States (railway) Engineers (2 companies)

Third Army
General Hon. Sir Julian Byng
 V Corps (Lieutenant-General Sir E. A. Fanshawe)
 47th (1/2nd London) Division
 63rd (Royal Naval) Division
 17th (Northern) Division
 2nd Division
 19th (Western) Division
 12th (Eastern) Division (from 8:30 p.m. on 25 March)
 IV Corps (Lieutenant-General Sir G. M. Harper)
 51st (Highland) Division
 6th Division
 25th Division
 19th (Western) Division (from 21 March)
 41st Division (from 22 March)
 42nd (East Lancashire) Division (from 24 March)
 62nd (2nd West Riding) Division (from 25 March)
 New Zealand Division (from 25/26 March)
 4th Australian Division (from 25/26 March)
 VI Corps (Lieutenant-General Sir J. A. L. Haldane)
 59th (2nd North Midland) Division
 34th Division
 3rd Division
 40th Division (from 21 March)
 Guards Division (from 22 March)
 31st Division (from 22 March)
 XVII Corps Corps (Lieutenant-General Sir Charles Fergusson, Bt.)
 15th (Scottish) Division
 4th Division
 Guards Division
 Cavalry Corps (Lieutenant-General Sir C. T. MacM. Kavanagh)
 1st Cavalry Division
 2nd Cavalry Division
 3rd Cavalry Division

French Group of Armies of Reserve 

General Émile Fayolle

Third Army

General Georges Louis Humbert
 V Corps (General Maurice Pellé)
 125th Division (from 22 March)
 1st Dismounted Cavalry Division (from 23 March)
 9th Division (from 23 March)
 10th Division (from 23 March)
 55th Division (from 24 March)
 1st Division (from 25 March)
 35th Division (from 25 March)
 53rd Division (part, from 26 March)
 77th Division (part, from 26 March)
 II Cavalry Corps (General Félix Adolphe Robillot)
 22nd Division (from 24 March)
 62nd Division (from 24 March)

First Army

General Marie-Eugène Debeney
 56th Division (from 25 March)
 II Cavalry Corps
 1st Cavalry Division (from 26 March)
 5th Cavalry Division (from 26 March)
 6th Cavalry Division (from 27 March)

Notes

Footnotes

Bibliography

External links

 British order of battle 1914–1918
 Battles and Engagements France and Flanders 1918
 Nafziger: German Order of Battle

World War I orders of battle
Battles of the Western Front (World War I)
Battles of World War I involving Australia
Battles of World War I involving the United Kingdom
Battles of World War I involving the United States
Battles of World War I involving Germany
Battles of World War I involving Canada
Battles of World War I involving France
Battles of World War I involving New Zealand
Battles of World War I involving South Africa
1918 in France